"We've Come a Long Way Baby" is a song written by L. E. White and Shirl Milete that was originally performed by American country music artist Loretta Lynn. It was released as a single in October 1978 via MCA Records.

Background and reception 
"We've Come a Long Way Baby" was recorded at the Bradley's Barn on June 29, 1976. Located in Mount Juliet, Tennessee, the session was produced by renowned country music producer Owen Bradley. Two additional tracks were recorded during this session.

"We've Come a Long Way Baby" reached number ten on the Billboard Hot Country Singles survey in 1970. Additionally, the song peaked at number six on the Canadian RPM Country Songs chart during this same period. It was included on her studio album, We've Come a Long Way Baby (1978).

Track listings 
7" vinyl single
 "We've Come a Long Way Baby" – 2:02
 "I Can't Feel You Anymore" – 3:12

Charts

References 

1978 songs
1978 singles
MCA Records singles
Loretta Lynn songs
Song recordings produced by Owen Bradley
Songs written by L. E. White